Jacques du Tillet (1857–1942) was a French author and critic. He published four novels. He was a theatre critic for the Revue politique et littéraire.

Works

References

1857 births
1942 deaths
French novelists
French theatre critics